Writer of the Purple Rage is a collection of short works by American author Joe R. Lansdale, published in 1994. It was nominated for a Bram Stoker Award in the "Fiction Collection" category.  The title is a play on the Philip José Farmer novella "Riders of the Purple Wage", and before that, the Zane Grey novel Riders of the Purple Sage.

Contents

"Bubba Ho-Tep" (nominated for the Bram Stoker Award; originally published in The King Is Dead, ed. Paul M. Sammon, 1994)
"By Bizarre Hands: play version"  (originally published in Cold Blood, ed. Richard Chizmar, 1991)
"The Diaper" or "The Adventure of the Little Rounder"  (originally published in Nova Express Summer 1990)
"Drive-In Date"  (originally published in Night Visions 8, 1991)
"Everybody Plays the Fool"  (originally published in Thunder’s Shadow Collector’s Magazine February 1993)
"Godzilla's Twelve Step Program"  (first publication)
"Hard On For Horror" (non-fiction; extended from shorter version)
"In the Cold, Dark Time"  (originally published in Dark Harvest Summer/Fall Preview: 1990)
"Incident On and Off a Mountain Road" (originally published in Night Visions 8, 1991)
"Love Doll: A Fable" (nominated for the Bram Stoker Award; originally published in Borderlands 2, ed. Thomas F. Monteleone, 1991)
"The Man With Two Lives"  (first publication)
"Mister Weed-Eater"  (originally published by Cahill Press, 1993)
"The Phone Woman" (originally published in Night Visions 8, 1991)
"Pilots" (with Dan Lowry; originally published in Stalkers, ed. Ed Gorman & Greenberg, 1989)
"Steppin' Out, Summer, '68"  (originally published in Night Visions 8, 1991)

This is the only collection which includes the short stories "The Diaper", "Everybody Plays the Fool", "Love Doll: A Fable" and "The Man With Two Lives", as well as the play version of "By Bizarre Hands".

References

External links
Author's Official Website: http://joerlansdale.com

Short story collections by Joe R. Lansdale
1994 short story collections
Horror short story collections
Cemetery Dance Publications books